Altzo is a town located in the province of Gipuzkoa, in the autonomous community of Basque Country, in the north of Spain. In 2014, Altzo had a total population of approximately 400.

References

External links
 Official Website Information available in Spanish and Basque.
 ALTZO in the Bernardo Estornés Lasa - Auñamendi Encyclopedia (Euskomedia Fundazioa) Information available in Spanish

Municipalities in Gipuzkoa